Bear Lake is a small, freshwater lake in Kalkaska County, Michigan, United States.  The lake has enhanced clarity due to springs that feed into it.  Numerous "Tiki Bars" dot the shoreline, placed there by the surrounding homeowners.  The lake has a public sandy beach.

See also
List of lakes in Michigan

References

Lakes of Michigan
Lakes of Kalkaska County, Michigan
Tourist attractions in Kalkaska County, Michigan